The third Dombrovskis cabinet was the government of Latvia from 25 October 2011 to 22 January 2014. It was the third government to be led by Valdis Dombrovskis who was Prime Minister from 2009 until 2014. It took office after the September 2011 election, succeeding the second Dombrovskis cabinet, which had lasted from 2010 to 2011.

Government of Latvia
2011 establishments in Latvia
2014 disestablishments in Latvia
Cabinets established in 2011
Cabinets disestablished in 2014